The Richards Group is an American advertising agency. It was once the largest independently-owned agency in the country. Working with founder Stan Richards, there are now far fewer than 35 creative group heads.

In October 2020, following racist comments about an advertising campaign idea made by the agency's founder, Stan Richards, the company lost two of its longtime clients, Motel 6 (34 years) and Home Depot (25 years); other clients also decided to leave the firm, including Keurig Dr Pepper, the brewers of Shiner Bock beer and grocery chain H-E-B. Richards (who had recently delegated most day-to-day management of the firm to his senior creative directors as part of a previously announced succession plan) resigned from the firm soon thereafter.

Based in Dallas, Texas, The Richards Group reports annual billings above $1 billion. Memorable work includes the Chick-fil-A Cows ("Eat Mor Chikin"), and the Motel 6 campaign featuring Tom Bodett.

Major clients include or have included Fruit of the Loom, The Home Depot, Sub-Zero/Wolf, and Zales. The agency handles advertising, public relations, and promotions for dozens of clients nationwide, in addition to sports/entertainment marketing for colleges and universities.

The Richards Group is associated by common ownership with Houston advertising agency Richards/Carlberg. In 2014, a $10 million fundraising campaign was completed to rededicate the advertising and public relations department at the University of Texas at Austin, naming it the Stan Richards School of Advertising and Public Relations. The university released a statement after Richards' 2020 comments and resignation from the firm condemning the incident.

History
Key Dates:

1953: Stan Richards begins doing freelance design work in Dallas.

1976: Company becomes a full-service advertising agency.

1986: Motel 6 is signed as a client.

2016:The Richards Group takes AOR (agency of record) for Blue Bell Creameries.

2018: Dish Network selects The Richards Group as its new creative agency of record.

2020: Richards Group Fired by Motel 6 Over Racist Remark by Agency Founder

2020: Home Depot Breaks With Richards Group Following Founder's Racist Remarks

2020:  H-E-B severs ties amid reports of racist comments by its CEO.

2020: Stan Richards resigns from The Richards Group.

References

Advertising agencies of the United States
Companies based in Dallas
Business services companies established in 1976
1976 establishments in Texas